is a Japanese fantasy manga series written and illustrated by Sōsuke Tōka. It has been serialized online via Echoes' user-submitted Manga Hack website since May 2017 and has been collected in fifteen tankōbon volumes by Enterbrain. The story follows the adventures of a little prince named Bojji, who was born deaf and tiny in size, and his friend Kage, a survivor of a wiped-out assassin clan, who understands Bojji’s words despite him being unable to speak.

An anime television series adaptation produced by Wit Studio aired from October 2021 to March 2022 on Fuji TV's Noitamina programming block. A series of special episodes, titled Ōsama Ranking: Yūki no Takarabako, will premiere in April 2023.

Synopsis

Setting
The title of the series refers to a same-named system by which a committee, acting in absentia for a race of powerful magical beings known as 'Gods', ranks the power and prosperity of the mortal world's many kings. The king that is bequeathed the number one ranking is entitled to a boon from the 'Divine Treasure Vault', a fabled stronghold brimming with untold riches and holy artifacts. While not all kings seek this power in earnest, the existence of the ranking and the ambitions of those who strive to sit atop it form the driving force of the narrative.

Plot
The story is about a little prince named Bojji who is deaf but above all naive, because despite many criticisms from his people about his accession to the throne, he does his best and dreams of becoming the greatest of kings. One day, he meets Kage (Shadow), a survivor of a wiped-out assassin clan, who understands his words despite Bojji being unable to speak due to his disability. The story follows the pair as they navigate the world and all of its adventures and darkness.

The inciting incident of the series' first arc is the death of Bojji's father, King Bosse, a legendary giant warrior who, in his prime, was widely renowned as the strongest man in the world. While Bojji's right to succession is affirmed by Bosse on his deathbed, there are those among the royal court that believe that Bojji's physical shortcomings make him unfit to rule and that his arrogant (but physically capable) younger half-brother, Prince Daida, is more suited for ascension. Chief among these dissenters is Bosse's widow and Daida's mother, Queen Hilling, who calls for a vote to circumvent Bosse's will and forgo Bojji's right to succession. The vote is passed and Daida is placed upon the throne.

Having been denied his birthright, Bojji requests he be allowed to undertake a journey so that he may gain experience and grow stronger. Hilling, who once had great affection for Bojji and regarded him as her own son, begrudgingly acquiesces. Unbeknownst to both of them, Daida, under the influence of an enigmatic figure, has set in motion a sinister plot to consolidate his power and achieve the position of number one in the Ranking of Kings.

Characters

The main protagonist of the story and the first prince of the Kingdom of Bosse. Born deaf and tiny in size, he was ridiculed and scorned openly by many within the palace and kingdom. Despite his disability, Bojji dreams of becoming a strong king like his father and always tries to maintain a smile in front of others. He is known for his kindness (which has earned him many unexpected allies), diligence, and intuition, which allows him to read lips and know what people are saying. He also possesses extreme agility and dodging ability unconventional for kings that tend to rely on strength, and like all members of his race is impervious to poison. Following Daida's coronation, he and Kage set off on a journey. His name is a wordplay on the Japanese word "bocchi" which means someone that does not have any friends.

A last surviving member of the shadow clan and Bojji's companion. Born to a clan of assassins, Kage was a young child when he witnessed his entire family murdered by the kingdom they served. He subsequently escaped and was exploited by a thug, who eventually sold him out for his ransom. Tempered by the rough way of the world, Kage then grew up using his clan's abilities to make a living off thieving. He eventually meets Bojji and is touched by his kindness and his situation, pledging to be his faithful friend. He is tasked by Bebin to follow and protect Bojji on their journey.  "Kage" in Japanese means "shadow".

Bojji's younger half-brother, the birth son of Queen Hiling and the current king. Like Bojji, he is hardworking and resilient, but possesses a streak of pride and arrogance in his strength that seems to take after their father. Deep down, he is secretly jealous of his brother, who he believes was able to get everyone's love and the position of king without any effort. In the time leading up to his coronation, Daida is manipulated by a Magic Mirror and is forcibly made the vessel for Bosse's reincarnation.

The queen, Daida's mother, and Bojji's stepmother. She used to be more doting and affectionate to Bojji, but following Daida's birth, adopted a stricter and more practical-minded personality regarding royal affairs, ultimately deeming Bojji unfit for rule. Despite being highly critical of Bojji, she treasures him just as much as her birth son, often spending much energy to heal any injuries he sustains. She allows Bojji to go on his journey with Domas and Hokuro, setting their destination to be her parents' home. Her name is from the English word "Healing"

The greatest swordsmaster in the Kingdom of Bosse, whose sword style reflects King Bosse's strength. He was assigned to be Bojji's tutor and while he treasures the prince very dearly, decided that he would never have power equivalent to his father and gave up on him. In an attempt to reaffirm his loyalty to a single lord, he pledges allegiance to Daida and attempts to assassinate Bojji by pushing him into the Hole of the Underworld. Overcome with regret, he cuts off his right hand later and rescues Hokuro from execution, intending to train him to become stronger. 

Daida's teacher who cares very deeply for his lord and has helped keep the Magic Mirror's deadly influence at bay. He wields a curved dagger, shuriken and is a snake tamer. Under Daida's orders, he tried to assassinate Apeas but was supposedly killed by the latter and sank through the ground, leaving his whereabouts unknown. He sends Kage to accompany Bojji and help him get stronger. 

An expressionless commander dubbed "Spear of the King" who is heavily loyal to King Bosse. Once a cowardly man, he trained with monsters under the supervision of Miranjo and earned his current title. He worked with the Magic Mirror to transfer Bosse's consciousness to Daida's body.

A large man dubbed "Shield of the Queen" who guards Hiling. He originally served King Bosse as 'King's Spear', but was later reassigned to guard the new queen, Hiling. Initially, he was upset by the decision but later was given the opportunity to decide whether or not Hiling was worth his protection, answering in the affirmative.

A low-ranking knight who deeply cares for Bojji after the latter comforted him upon his mother's death. He was ordered to accompany Bojji on his journey and look after his personal care, being the only knight that knew sign language. After Domas' betrayal, his pride as a knight and loyalty to Bojji compel him to return to the kingdom, risking his life to inform Hiling of the news. He is rescued by Domas just before his execution and undergoes training to become stronger.

The former king and father of Bojji and Daida. He was a giant who yearned to be the strongest man in the world and made a deal with a demon, choosing to steal power from his very own son. Feeling remorseful later, Bosse chose to become king and establish a country to ensure Bojji had everything he ever wanted in life. He is subsequently reincarnated in Daida's body.  His name is from the English word "Boss".

Bosse's first wife and subsequent First Queen of the Bosse Kingdom, and Bojji's birth mother. She was executed by Miranjo when Bojji was young. 

A mysterious mirror who advises Daida on his actions. Sealed within is actually the spirit of a woman named Miranjo, whose body is encased in ice within the palace's basement alongside various other deadly monsters. Miranjo has two masked guards who serve her and was previously involved in Apeas' training to become a high-ranking official. She describes herself as "someone who shared the joys and sorrows of [King Bosse]", later creating an elixir for Daida to become a vessel for reincarnation.

The king of the Underworld and commander of the Order of the Underworld – the most powerful legion of soldiers that slaughter demons and prevent them from wrecking havoc. He has a complex about his face and wide mouth and dislikes his younger brother Despa due to his good looks. However, it does not stop both of them working together in some situations. 

The younger brother of Desha and Despa and former commander of the Order of the Underworld. He once was a kind-hearted prince who swore to found an order of knights that shared his values. He also holds the title of 'Sword King of The Underworld' due to his master skills in swordsmanship. After unwillingly receiving true immortality, an ability that also slowly consumed his humanity, he became a remorseless monster that inflicts pain on his victims.
Due to his madness, both of his brothers have no choice other than to imprison him in the Underworld, where he remained until freed by Miranjo to conquer the Bosse Kingdom.

The middle brother of the king of the Underworld and Ōken. Unlike his older brother, Despa is much weaker, vainer and money-minded. He takes Bojji and Kage into his care and promises to train Bojji up to become stronger (for a price).

Media

Manga
Ranking of Kings is written and illustrated by Sōsuke Tōka. It has been serialized online via Echoes' user-submitted Manga Hack website since May 20, 2017 and has been collected in fifteen tankōbon volumes by Enterbrain as of December 12, 2022. The series is published in English digitally by BookLive on BookWalker.

Anime
The anime television series adaptation is produced by Wit Studio and aired from October 15, 2021, to March 25, 2022, on Fuji TV's Noitamina block. The series is directed by Yōsuke Hatta, with Taku Kishimoto supervising the series' scripts, Atsuko Nozaki designing the characters, and MAYUKO composing the series' music. King Gnu performed the first opening theme "Boy", while Yama performed the first ending theme "Oz." Vaundy performed the second opening theme "Hadaka no Yūsha" (Naked Hero), while Milet performed the second ending theme "Flare". Funimation licensed the series for streaming outside of Asia. Medialink licensed the series in Southeast Asia and will stream it exclusively on iQIYI. The Tokyo Federation for the Deaf supervises the sign language depicted in the show. Funimation announced an English dub version of the show.

In August 2022, a series of special episodes, titled Ōsama Ranking: Yūki no Takarabako, was announced. The cast and staff from the anime series will return for the series, which will feature a story that was not in the original anime. It is set to premiere on April 14, 2023, on Fuji TV's Noitamina block. People 1 will perform the opening theme "Gold", while Aimer will perform the ending theme "Atemonaku" (Aimlessly).

Episode list

Reception

Manga
As of December 2021, the manga had over 1.5 million copies in circulation.

Ranking of Kings ranked at the 6th place on the Tsutaya Comic Awards 2019. It ranked 5th on Manga Shimbun Taishō 2019. The 2020 edition of Takarajimasha's Kono Manga ga Sugoi!, which surveys professionals in the manga and publishing industry, named Ranking of Kings the seventh best manga series for male readers. The characters Bojji and Kage were nominated in the Best lead male actor and Best supporting male actor respectively, in the Magademy Award 2022. Ranking of Kings was nominated in the Youth Selections category at the 50th Angoulême International Comics Festival in 2023.

Anime
In China, the anime received acclaim from viewers for its heartwarming story. The show received nearly 48 million views on Bilibili with only 4 episodes available.

Awards and nominations

Notes

References

Further reading

External links
 
 

2021 anime television series debuts
2023 anime television series debuts
Anime series based on manga
Aniplex
Comedy anime and manga
Coming-of-age anime and manga
Enterbrain manga
Fantasy anime and manga
Fiction about curses
Fiction about giants
Funimation
Japanese webcomics
Kadokawa Dwango franchises
Literature about deaf people
Medialink
Noitamina
Shōnen manga
Television shows about deaf people
Upcoming anime television series
Webcomics in print
Wit Studio